Louisville High School may refer to:

Louisville High School (California), Roman Catholic college preparatory high school for young women located in Los Angeles
Louisville High School (Mississippi)
Louisville High School (Nebraska)
Louisville High School (Ohio), a public high school located in Louisville, Ohio, USA